Masudabad may refer to:
Naryn Castle, Ardabil
Naryn Castle, Nain
Naryn Castle, Meybod
 Naryn Castle, Sardrud
 Naryn Kala Castle